Pichvnari (also transliterated as Pičvnari) is the site of a Colchian settlement; its ancient name is unknown. It is within modern Georgia, on the coast at the confluence of the Choloki and Ochkhamuri rivers, about 10 kilometres north of the seaside resort of Kobuleti.

Excavations restarted in 1998 as an Anglo-Georgian collaborative effort (British-Georgian Pichvnari Expedition of Pichvnari) between the Batumi Archaeological Museum, the N. Berdzenishvili Batumi Research Institute and the Ashmolean Museum of Oxford University.

A multilevel Bronze Age settlement of Pichori is located on the coast north of Pichvnari.

See also
 Iranian Kohl-Tube from Pichvnari

References

External links
British-Georgian Pichvnari Expedition

Former populated places in the Caucasus
Archaeological sites in Georgia (country)
Geography of Adjara
Bronze Age in Georgia
Colchian culture